Carl Pahlin (28 January 1915 – 5 January 2010) was a Swedish cross-country skier who competed in the 1930s. He won two medals at the 1939 FIS Nordic World Ski Championships with a silver in the 4 × 10 km relay and a bronze in the 18 km event.

Cross-country skiing results
All results are sourced from the International Ski Federation (FIS).

World Championships
 2 medals – (1 gold, 1 bronze)

References

External links
 
 Carl Pahlin, till minne (In memory of Carl Pahlin), allehanda.se 
 Längdskidor Sverige: Svenska OS, VM och EM-medaljörer (Swedish cross-country skiers: Olympic Games, WM and EM medalists), www.sporthistoria.se 

Swedish male cross-country skiers
FIS Nordic World Ski Championships medalists in cross-country skiing
1915 births
2010 deaths